Individual dressage equestrian at the 2006 Asian Games was held in Equestrian Dressage Arena, Doha, Qatar from December 4 to 5, 2006. The event consisted of three rounds, Young Riders (YR) team test, Young Riders (YR) preliminary test (Prix St-Georges) and Young Riders (YR) freestyle test.

Schedule
All times are Arabia Standard Time (UTC+03:00)

Results

YR team

YR preliminary

YR freestyle

References
Individual 1st Qualifier
Individual Final
Results at FEI
Results

External links
Official website

Individual dressage